The following is a list of Basilicas in Rome. An ecclesiastical basilica is a Roman Catholic church building which has been granted special status by the Pope. 
There are 66 such churches in Rome, more than any other city, and more than 125 of the 131 countries in the world that have basilicas.

Major Basilicas in Rome
There are four major basilicas of the Catholic Church: All four are in Rome, and are distinguished by their having a holy door and for being prescribed as destinations for visits as one of the conditions for gaining the Roman Jubilee. 
They are also signified by an Umbraculum (a baldachin resembling an umbrella, made of cloth of gold and red velvet) and a Tintinnabulum (a small bell mounted on a pole).
The four are also designated Papal basilicas, so that only the Pope or his delegate may celebrate Mass at the high altar.

Minor papal basilicas
Several minor basilicas are also designated as papal basilicas; there is one such in Rome,

Minor basilicas 
A minor basilica is a church designated as such by apostolic grant (or from immemorial custom) as an outstanding centre of pastoral and liturgical excellence. They are often also sites of pilgrimage. Minor basilicas are also marked by the tintinnabulum  and umbraculum, though for a minor basilica this is of yellow and red silk.

Notes

References

Sources
 List of all Minor Basilicas from GCatholic

 
Rome
Ecclesiastical basilicas in Rome
Basilicas (Catholic Church)